USS Halloran (DE-305) was a  of the United States Navy.

Namesake
William Ignatius Halloran was born on 23 July 1915 at Cleveland, Ohio. He enlisted in the United States Naval Reserve as an apprentice seaman on 14 August 1940. He went missing during the Japanese Attack on Pearl Harbor on 7 December 1941.

Construction and commissioning 
Halloran was laid down by Mare Island Navy Yard, Vallejo, California, on 21 June 1943; launched on 14 January 1944; sponsored by Mrs. L. J. Halloran, mother; and commissioned on 27 May 1944.

World War II Pacific Theater
After shakedown, Halloran departed California as a convoy escort on 31 July arriving Pearl Harbor on 9 August. Sailing for Eniwetok on 16 August, she arrived on 24 August and two days later she became part of the escort screen for fast oiler replenishment group steaming to the Western Pacific. Based at Manus, and later Ulithi, Halloran continued this duty until on 29 November, helping to bring vital fuel to fleet units off Palau, Yap, and Luzon. While moored at Ulithi on 20 November, she witnessed the torpedoing of oiler  and in company with  searched the harbor fruitlessly for a suspected midget submarine.

Screening tankers to Marshall Islands 
From 5 to 7 December, Halloran screened two escort carriers transporting replacement aircraft to Manus, and on 14 December she sailed to escort tankers to Eniwetok. She departed on 19 December for Pearl Harbor, arriving Christmas Eve.

Iwo Jima 
Halloran was underway again on 22 January 1945, this time as a unit of the escort screen for the amphibious task force designated to capture Iwo Jima. After patrolling the area around the training site at Saipan, she served as a barrier patrol ship during the actual landings on 19 February. She continued this duty until 28 February when, she departed with a convoy. Steaming via Saipan and Tulagi, she reached Espiritu Santo on 15 March.

Okinawa 
The far-steaming destroyer escort's next assignment was with the Okinawa assault forces. Departing Espiritu Santo on 25 March, she arrived off Okinawa on 9 April and began vital anti-submarine barrier patrols.

Okinawa kamikaze strike 
She repelled six attacking Japanese aircraft on 12 April, splashing one and damaging two others, and was narrowly missed by a torpedo on 20 April. After performing various other duties, including assistance to the stricken  and escort duty to Saipan and 'back, she resumed her barrier patrols on 30 May. A kamikaze aircraft attacked Halloran on 21 June, but her gunners shot it down in the nick of time a scant 75 yards from the ship. However, an exploding bomb killed three men and caused considerable damage to hull and superstructure.

Philippines 
After repairs at Kerama Retto, Halloran patrolled off Ie Shima from 5 to 13 July, then assumed tactical command of an escort screen for LST's en route to the Philippines. After arriving Leyte Gulf on 17 July, she patrolled at San Pedro Bay, Leyte, and Lopez Bay, Luzon, prior to departing the Philippines for the United States on 10 September.

Stateside decommissioning  
Halloran arrived San Diego, California, on 29 September and sailed three days later for Charleston, South Carolina, where she arrived on 11 October. She decommissioned at Charleston on 2 November 1945. Her name was struck from the Navy List on 28 November 1945, and she was sold on 7 March 1947.

Awards  
Halloran received three battle stars for World War II service.

References

External links 
 
 Ships of the U.S. Navy, 1940-1945 DE-305 USS Halloran
 DE Action And Damage Timeline of World War II
 uboat.net - Evarts class Destroyer Escorts
 USS Halloran (DE 305)

Evarts-class destroyer escorts
World War II frigates and destroyer escorts of the United States
Ships built in Vallejo, California
1944 ships